Mary Jane Watkins, Baroness Watkins of Tavistock FRCN (born 5 March 1955) is a British Professor of Nursing. She currently is emeritus professor of healthcare leadership at Plymouth University and Deputy Vice Chancellor of the university.

She trained at the Wolfson School of Nursing, Westminster Hospital (RGN, 1976) and at South London and Maudsley Nursing School (RMN, 1979). She obtained her PhD from King's College London in 1985. In 2019 she was made a Fellow of the Royal College of Nursing  

She was nominated for life peerage by the House of Lords Appointments Commission and was created Baroness Watkins of Tavistock, of Buckland Monachorum in the County of Devon, on 2 November 2015. She sits in the House of Lords as a crossbencher.

References

External links
 Parliament.uk
 House of Lords Appointments Commission
 

1955 births
Living people
Alumni of King's College London
Crossbench life peers
People's peers
Life peeresses created by Elizabeth II

Fellows of the Royal College of Nursing
British nurses